Almir Oda (born 10 January 2004) is a professional footballer currently playing as a midfielder for Rapid Wien II.

International career
Oda has represented North Macedonia and Austria at youth international level.

Career statistics

Club

Notes

References

2004 births
Living people
Macedonian footballers
North Macedonia youth international footballers
Austrian footballers
Austria youth international footballers
Association football midfielders
2. Liga (Austria) players
SK Rapid Wien players